Adesmus tribalteatus is a species of beetle in the family Cerambycidae. It was described by Bates in 1881. It is known from Brazil, Peru, and Bolivia.

References

Adesmus
Beetles described in 1881